The list below is a database that contains hospitals in Romania. All public hospitals receive funding from the Ministry of Health. Romania has a universal healthcare system, hence all public hospitals are charge-free and available to each citizen of the European Union. There are 425 operational hospitals across the country. At the moment, there are 6.2 hospital beds available per 1000 citizens.

As a result of the European recession, the executive has decided to shut down 67 hospitals nationwide.

Classification
In Romania, each hospital is assigned to a certain city, town, region or medical university.

A dispensary ( in Romanian) is common out in the countryside. They do not have the facilities or labor power of a hospital, but some famous dispensaries appear in the list below.

A town hospital ( in Romanian) is a hospital where residents of a particular town are being admitted into. Such hospitals are able to sustain most medical emergencies and common surgeries.

A municipal hospital ( in Romanian) is a hospital where residents of a particular municipality are being admitted into. Such hospitals usually have a greater bed capacity than a town hospital.

A county hospital ( in Romanian) is a hospital where citizens from all over the county are being brought in. If the procedure cannot be performed into a town hospital, the patients are being admitted in a hospital as such. This kind of hospital has a wide range of departments and a high bedding capacity.
 
A university hospital ( in Romanian) is a hospital ascribed to a medical university. Such hospitals have a state-of-the-art medical technologies and tend to perform experimental operations.

A sanatorium ( in Romanian) is a recovery facility where patients with a chronic disease are being admitted into shortly before treatment.

A private hospital is a hospital that only operates with people that own a private medical insurance. Such hospitals have a closed circuit network and differ from the public hospitals.

Active hospitals
 
This list has been created with information provided by the Romanian Ministry of Health.

References

Romania
Hospitals
Romania